The Unity Alliance of Iraq (Arabic: ائتلاف وحدة العراق I’itilaf Wehdat al-Iraq) commonly known as  Iraq's Unity, Iraqi Unity or Wassat is an Iraqi political coalition formed to contest the 2010 Iraqi parliamentary election. The coalition was formed by Sheikh Ahmed Abu Risha, the head of the Awakening movement, a Sunni tribal militia which was successful in significantly reducing the insurgency in al-Anbar Governorate and was then reformed into a political party, the Iraq Awakening and Independents National Alliance, which won the most seats in the 2009 Al Anbar governorate election. The Awakening Alliance joined forces with Iraq's Shi'a interior minister Jawad al-Bolani and his secular Iraqi Constitutional Party and Ahmed Abdul Ghafour al-Samarrai, chief of Sunni Endowment Office. The list is led by Jawad al-Bolani.

2010 elections 
During the 2010 elections the Iraq Unity List consisted of the following parties:

Iraqi Constitution Party – led by Jawad al-Bolani
Iraq Awakening and Independents National Alliance – led by Abu Risha
Charter Gathering – led by al-Samarrai
Republican Gathering – led by Saad al-Janabi
Independent candidates, including Kurdish politician Nehru Kasnazani, former minister of defence Saadoun al-Dulaimi and Anbar tribal leader Abu Azzam al-Tamimi.

Results

References

2010 establishments in Iraq
Political parties established in 2010
Political party alliances in Iraq